Yakeen  is an Indian film directed by Brij Sadanah released in 1969. The movie stars Dharmendra in a double role where one character plays the role of villain in the movie. It also stars Sharmila Tagore, supported by David and M. B. Shetty. The music composed is by Shankar Jaikishan.

The movie was a major success at the box office reinforcing Dharmendra's star status in 1969.

Plot
Rajesh (Dharmendra) is a scientist. He is injured following instructions of Dr. Sharma in a secret experiment and granted leave. Rajesh lives with his dog, cook Bhola. He is in love with Rita (Sharmila Tagore). Rajesh goes to meet Rita and asks for her hand from her mother, who agrees. He finds his things spread on bed on returning to his hotel room. Shetty fools Bhola and takes pictures of Rajesh's house. Sharma calls him during his leave. He meets Sharma, but is surprised to know that Sharma did not call him. He and Sharma quarrel when he asks for leave to marry. Rajesh reaches office on being called by Sharma, but finds him murdered. Rajesh goes to call the police and returns with them to find the body missing. Intelligence chief Mr Roy and his assistant Mr. D'Mello ask Rajesh to take the murder blame of Sharma, so that miscreants after Sharma's research can be caught. Roy devises an escape plan for Rajesh, but it goes wrong and Rajesh is kidnapped by Shetty and taken to Mozambique. Rajesh is imprisoned and a look alike named Garson is sent to India. Garson is with blue eyes and a voice different from Rajesh's. Garson uses contact lenses and gets a throat operation to portray Rajesh's voice. His unconscious body is found in an Indian sea. Rita accepts him as Rajesh, although she has some misgivings after he touches the feet of another lady instead of Rita's mother. Rita is pregnant with Rajesh's baby. Garson is given a similar mole as Rajesh. Rajesh's dog and cook realize what has happened, so Garson kills them to avoid their exposing him. The authorities are also less trusting. Will Garson be caught out or not and end up marrying the pregnant Rita? Will Rajesh manage to escape and make it back to India to expose and kill Garson?

Cast
 Dharmendra - Rajesh / Garson (Dual Role)
 Sharmila Tagore - Rita
 David Abraham - Mr. Roy
 Kamini Kaushal... Rita's Mother
 Anwar Hussain... Mr. D'Mello
 Asit Sen... Bhola
 Brahma Bharadwaj... Dr. Sharma
 Gautam Mukherjee... Mr. Shrivastav
 Vinod Mehra
 Master Shahid... Billu
 Neelam
 M. B. Shetty... Photographer 
 Devi Chand
 Harbans Singh
 Sunder (actor)... Grandfather of the guy who found body at the beach
 Moosa
 Mukri... Father of the guy who found body at the beach
 Corrina... Dancer
 Sherry
 Deven Verma... Guy who found body at the beach (uncredited)
 Mohammad Uddin
 Helen as Night Club performer in song "Bachke Kahan Jaoge"

Soundtrack

References

External links
 

1960s Hindi-language films
1969 films
Films scored by Shankar–Jaikishan
Films directed by Brij Sadanah